Idol on Parade is a 1959 British comedy movie produced by Warwick Films, directed by John Gilling and featuring William Bendix, Anthony Newley, Sid James and Lionel Jeffries. It was based on John Antrobus' first screenplay.

The movie depicts Jeep Jackson, the main character, during his two years of compulsory National Service in the British military. It was based on the 1958 novel Idle on Parade by William Camp which in turn was inspired by Elvis Presley's conscription into the US Army.

The movie featured Newley singing five songs in a cockney accent for the movie. One of the songs, "I've Waited So Long", reached No. 3 in the UK chart.

Plot

The film considers what happens when a pop-star is conscripted into the army. He tries to continue his recording career while still undergoing training on camp. When a different J Jackson materialises they take the opportunity to post Jeep to the Outer Hebrides to get rid of his disruptive impact on the camp.

When a group of soldiers go to the cinema in the film, they go to see The Cockleshell Heroes, in which Newley was an actor.

Cast
 William Bendix as Sergeant Major Lush
 Anthony Newley as Jeep Jackson
 Anne Aubrey as Caroline
 Lionel Jeffries as Bertie
 Sid James as Herbie
 David Lodge as Shorty
 Dilys Laye as Renee
 William Kendall as Commanding Officer
 Bernie Winters as Joseph Jackson
 Harry Fowler as Ron
 Percy Herbert as Sergeant (Hebrides)

Production
The film was based on a novel published in 1958. The Observer said the book was "very funny". It concerned an intellectual in the army, rather than a pop singer.

Filming started 10 November 1958. It was the first time William Bendix worked in England.

Reception
The Monthly Film Bulletin described the film as "trite... a waste of good comedy talent."

Variety called it "a straightforward army farce... pure corn".

It was the first time Newley sang in a film. Four of the songs from the soundtrack made the top 20. "I got a bigger kick out of being on the hit parade than anything I've ever done," said Newley.

References

External links

Idol on Parade at Reel Streets
Idle on Parade at BFI

1959 films
1959 comedy films
Films directed by John Gilling
Films based on British novels
Military humor in film
British comedy films
British black-and-white films
1950s English-language films
1950s British films